Haplomitrium gibbsiae is a species of liverwort from New Zealand.

The specific Latin epithet of gibbsiae is in honour of Lilian Gibbs (1870–1925), a British botanist.

References

Calobryales
Plants described in 1917
Flora of New Zealand